Maverick City Vol. 3 Part 1 is the debut live album by American contemporary worship music collective Maverick City Music, which was released independently on April 17, 2020. The featured worship leaders on the album are Chandler Moore, Bri Babineaux, Majesty Rose, KJ Scriven, Amanda Lindsey Cook, Joe L Barnes, Naomi Raine, Alton Eugene, Steffany Gretzinger, Maryanne J. George, and Chris Brown of Elevation Worship.

The album was supported by the release of "Man of Your Word" and "Promises" as singles. "Man of Your Word" went on to become the collective's breakthrough hit, peaking at number 18 on the Hot Christian Songs chart. "Promises" also became a hit single, reaching number one on the Hot Christian Songs and Hot Gospel Songs charts, and peaking at number 11 on the Bubbling Under Hot 100 chart. Maverick City Vol. 3 Part 1 achieved commercial success in the United States, the album having debuted at number six on Billboards Top Christian Albums Chart and number two on Top Gospel Albums Chart. Maverick City Vol. 3 Part 1 was nominated for the GMA Dove Award for Gospel Worship Album of the Year at the 2020 GMA Dove Awards. The album won the Billboard Music Award for Top Gospel Album at the 2021 Billboard Music Awards.

Singles
Maverick City Music released the song "Man of Your Word" which features Chandler Moore and KJ Scriven, to Christian radio stations in the United States on August 21, 2020, being their debut radio single. "Man of Your Word" peaked at number 18 on the Hot Christian Songs chart, and spent a total of twenty-six non-consecutive weeks on the chart.

On May 3, 2021, Maverick City Music released the radio version of "Promises" featuring Joe L Barnes and Naomi Raine as the second single from the album. The song reached number one on both the Hot Christian Songs and the Hot Gospel Songs charts.

Reception

Critical response
NewReleaseToday's Jasmin Patterson praised the album, applauding the collective for "authentic passion and unique sound that is so refreshing to worship music."

Accolades

Commercial performance
In the United States, the album debuted at number six on Top Christian Albums Chart, and number two on Top Gospel Albums Chart.

In the United Kingdom, Maverick City Vol. 3 Part 1 debuted on the OCC's Official Christian & Gospel Albums Chart at number 15.

Track listing

Charts

Weekly charts

Year-end charts

Release history

References

External links
  on PraiseCharts

2020 live albums
Maverick City Music albums